Jesús Maria Figueroa (born February 20, 1957) is a Dominican former professional baseball player. He appeared in 115 games during the 1980 baseball season with the Chicago Cubs, mostly as a pinch hitter and defensive replacement. Figueroa also played 611 games in Minor League Baseball, over the course of nine seasons.

Figueroa works for the Toronto Blue Jays as their batting practice pitcher, a position he has held since 1989. He was a member of the 1992 and '93 teams that won back-to-back World Series.

References

External links

1957 births
Living people
Chicago Cubs players
Dominican Republic expatriate baseball players in the United States
Fort Lauderdale Yankees players
Knoxville Blue Jays players

Major League Baseball players from the Dominican Republic
Major League Baseball outfielders
Phoenix Giants players
West Haven Yankees players
Wichita Aeros players